Armchair Apocrypha  is American singer-songwriter Andrew Bird's fourth studio album and his third post-Bowl of Fire album. The album features more electric guitars, a change from the more acoustic-oriented Eggs, though the songs are similar in character if slightly more straightforward.

Writing and composition
 "Simple X" is sampled from the song "Simple Exercises" by collaborator Dosh, off his solo album, Pure Trash. Lyrics, additional instrumentation and structure are provided by Bird.
 An earlier version of "Imitosis," called "I" (also called "Capital I" live) appears on his 2003 album Weather Systems.
 The song "Darkmatter" contains the same lyrics as the song "Sweetbreads", which can be found on the live EP Fingerlings 1.
 Both bonus tracks also evolved from previous songs: "Sick of Elephants" was originally known as "Sycophantitis" and "Self-Torture" adds lyrics and incorporates the melody from the instrumental "The Water Jet Cilice" from Fingerlings 3. Haley Bonar, who opened some shows on Bird's tour, sings background vocals on four songs.
 In an interview with The A.V. Club, Bird mentioned that melodies are easier for him to write than lyrics. He was fascinated with the Scythians in 8th grade, so he decided to challenge himself to write a song about them as a way to jump-start his songwriting process.

Reception

The album has been given a Metacritic score of 81 out of 100 based on 31 reviews, indicating universal acclaim.

The album debuted at number 76 on the U.S. Billboard 200, selling about 11,000 copies in its first week.  The album has sold over 100,000 copies by November 2008.

Track listing

Personnel 
 Andrew Bird - Violin, Vocals, Whistling, Guitar, Glockenspiel
 Haley Bonar – Vocals (tracks 1, 9–11)
 Jon Davis – Bass clarinet (track 7)
 Martin Dosh – Drums, electric piano (Rhodes, Wurlitzer), other sounds
 Ben Durrant – Guitar (tracks 1, 6)
 Chris Morrissey – Bass (tracks 1, 2, 4, 6, 11)
 Kevin O'Donnell – Drums (track 4)
 Jeremy Ylvisaker – Guitar (track 10)

Technical personnel 
 David Boucher – Mixing (tracks 5, 6)
 Ben Durrant – Co-producer; mixing at Pachyderm Studios, Cannon Falls, MN (tracks 1, 2, 4, 7–10, 12); recording at Crazy Beast Studio, Northeast Minneapolis (tracks 1, 2, 6–10, 12; vocals and guitars for tracks 4, 5)
 Dan Dietrich – Recording of additional tracks at Wall2Wall Recording, Chicago (tracks 4, 10)
 Martin Dosh – Additional recording (track 7)
 Tom Herbers – Mixing at Third Ear Recording, Minneapolis (tracks 3, 11); recording at Third Ear (tracks 3, 5, 11)
 Gregg Norman – Recording of basic tracks at Electrical Audio, Chicago (track 4)
 Roger Seibel – Mastering at SAE Mastering, Phoenix
 Brent Sigmeth – Mixing at Pachyderm Studios (tracks 1, 2, 4, 7–10, 12)
 Quemadura – Artwork and design
 Lynne Roberts-Goodwin – Photography (of birds)
 Cameron Wittig – Photography (of Andrew Bird)

Charts

References

Andrew Bird albums
2007 albums
Fat Possum Records albums